Gabriëls is a surname. Notable people with the surname include:

Jaak Gabriëls (born 1943), Belgian politician
Jan-Willem Gabriëls (born 1979), Dutch rower
Bert Gabriëls, Belgian comedian

Dutch-language surnames
Patronymic surnames
Surnames from given names